Syntrichopappus is a genus of flowering plants in the family Asteraceae, found in the Southwestern United States and northern Mexico, including Baja California. It is a member of the Heliantheae alliance of the Asteraceae. There are two species. Common names include xerasid and Frémont's-gold.

The name "Syntrichopappus" derives from a Greek name: "syn" = "joined together", "tricho" = "hair", of the "pappus", which means many bristles fused at the base (however some species have no pappus). The common name "xerasid" derives from Greek, meaning "son of dryness".

Description

Leaves
Leaves are simple, alternate, sometimes with the lowest ones opposite.

Inflorescence
Flower heads are solitary. There is one yellow (or white with red veins) ray flower per phyllary, with 3-lobed ligules. The yellow disk flowers are narrowly funnel shaped.

Fruits
The fruits have 0 to many pappus bristles, fused at the base.

Species
Syntrichopappus fremontii (yellowray Frémont's gold) is native to desert regions of the American southwest and adjacent Baja California. It is a small woolly herb just a few centimeters tall bearing flower heads with usually five toothed yellow ray florets.
Syntrichopappus lemmonii (pinkray Frémont's gold) is endemic to California, where it can be found in the southern coastal mountain ranges, including the Transverse Ranges. Its flower heads contain white, red-veined ray florets with pink undersides.

References

External links
Jepson Manual Treatment
USDA Plants Profile
Flora of North America
Photo gallery: S. fremontii
Photo gallery: S. lemmonii

Madieae
Asteraceae genera